Jamie Webster (born 1994) is an English singer, songwriter and musician.

A former electrician who initially sang cover versions in local pubs in Liverpool city centre. In October 2020, his debut album We Get By, released on Modern Sky UK, reached a peak of number 6 on the UK Albums Chart, and he became the inaugural number-one artist in the newly formed UK Official Folk Album Charts, ahead of Laura Marling, Kate Rusby, and Levellers. Also in October 2020, Boss, a live album of Webster singing football songs, charted in the folk chart top 10.

Webster's shows have become synonymous with Liverpool F.C. and their supporter culture, with The Guardian describing him as "the semi official musician of the football club". Webster began headlining fan affiliated appearances at UEFA Champions League final box parks in Kyiv and Madrid in 2019 to 60,000 fans. After a video of him playing the song "Allez Allez Allez", his reworking of Italo disco classic L'estate sta finendo by Righeira, went viral in 2018, the song became the soundtrack to the team's European successes under Jürgen Klopp. Webster performed for the players at their after party following their victory at the 2019 UEFA Champions League Final alongside Chelcee Grimes and host Colin Murray. Jürgen Klopp himself surprised Webster by appearing at a Supporters Club performance in Michigan and joined in with a rendition of Allez Allez Allez, and Webster has recorded duets with Liverpool players past and present such as Jamie Carragher and Alisson Becker as well as appearing at events with his childhood heroes such as Ian Rush, Robbie Fowler and Bruce Grobbelaar. His song "This Place" was used by Sky Sports to soundtrack the trophy lift when Liverpool won the 2019-20 Premier League title. Webster has also been a frequent guest on The Anfield Wrap.

Webster has also been able to perform to crowds in places such as New Delhi, and supported established Liverpool band Cast, but was disappointed at having to miss out on a Glastonbury Festival since it was postponed twice due to the COVID-19 pandemic. The Liverpool Echo named Webster the 11th most-influential Merseysider in its 2020 Power List. Lyrics from his song "Something's Gotta Give", "How can you tell me that this is where it's at / When all the clowns are calling the shots?", have been quoted on social media with people using the song to channel their frustration at politicians.

On 3 May 2022, Webster announced he would be performing on the Left Field stage at Glastonbury Festival 2022.  He also stated he would also be there as a fan as well as an act and expressed his gratefulness to his fans who had made this happen.

Discography

Albums

External links

References

Living people
1994 births
English male singer-songwriters
Musicians from Liverpool
English folk musicians
English folk singers
21st-century British singers
21st-century British male singers
Live Here Now artists